Hala Helmy el-Said (born 19 May 1957)  is the current Egyptian Minister of Planning and Economic Development.

Early life and career 
Hala was born in Cairo in 1957. She is the first elected dean of the Faculty of Economics and Political Science from 2011 to 2016 at Cairo University. She also held the position of Assistant President of Cairo University for Scientific Research Affairs and External Relations from September 2013 to 2016.

Qualifications 
Hala holds the following degrees:
 Doctor of Philosophy in Economics from the Faculty of Economics and Political Science from Cairo University - in 1989
 Master's degree in economics with excellent grades from the faculty of economics and political sciences from Cairo University - in 1983

References 

1957 births 
Cairo University alumni 
Politicians from Cairo
Women government ministers of Egypt
Living people
Planning ministers of Egypt
21st-century Egyptian women politicians
21st-century Egyptian politicians